Araceli "Arly" Jover is a Spanish actress. She is best known for her role as the villainous vampire Mercury in the 1998 superhero film Blade.

Life and career
Araceli Jover was born in Melilla, a Spanish region. After living there for five years, her family was forced to move to Mallorca, in the Balearic Islands (Spain) because of her father's work as a soldier. She is the youngest of seven siblings, four sisters and three brothers.

During her early years, she wanted to become a dancer. She began dancing at the age of 8. At 14, she dropped out of school, and at 15, she won a scholarship from the Comité Hispano Norteamericano. Because of this, she left Spain and moved to New York City in order to continue to study at the School of American Ballet under Martha Graham. After two years and half in the United States, her career then moved on to becoming an actress sometime around 1995–1996. She had her first role in an episode of the TV show Women: Stories of Passion and starred in two international films Tango, and The Ballad of Johnny-Jane. After that, she did more work in TV, before making her first American film debut in Blade, in 1998, as Mercury; the vampire lover of Deacon Frost.

In the following years she starred in various small roles in films and TV episodes, as well as larger roles in other films such as Fish in a Barrel, and Vampires: Los Muertos. After 18 years in the United States, she then moved to France. Shortly after arriving there, she got a major role in the film Empire of the Wolves alongside Jean Reno.

Currently, she lives in Paris, France, with her daughter, Shai. Her family still lives in Majorca, Spain, where Arly visits them every year during the summer.

Filmography
 Tango (1994)
 The Ballad of Johnny-Jane (1995)
 Blade (1998) — Mercury
 Maria & Jose (2000) — Maria
 Everything Put Together (2000) — Nurse Edna
 The Young Unknowns (2000) — Paloma
 Four Dogs Playing Poker (2000) — Maria
 Fish in a Barrel (2001) — Nina
 Impostor (2001 film) (2001) — Newscaster #2
 Vampires: Los Muertos (2002) — Una
 April's Shower (2003) — Sophie
 Empire of the Wolves (2005) — Anna Heymes
 Madame Irma (2006) — Ines
 Two Worlds (2007) — Delphine
 Little Ashes (2009) — Gala Dali (UK-Spanish production)
 The Minister (2011) — Séverine Saint-Jean
 Qui a envie d'être aimé? (2011) — Claire
 The Girl with the Dragon Tattoo (2011) — Liv
 Turning Tide (2013) — Anna Bruckner
 The Idealist (2015) — Estibaliz
 A Prominent Patient (2016) — Marcia Davenport
 Axolotl Overkill (2017) — Alice

Television
 Women: Stories of Passion (1993) — Pascal
 Players (1998) — Kiva
 Dragnet (2003) — Katrina Fluery
 L'Enfant d'une autre (2005)
 Sense8 (2018) - Georges

References

External links

 
 
 
 

Living people
People from Melilla
Actresses from Paris
People from Mallorca
Spanish film actresses
Spanish television actresses
Spanish female dancers
20th-century Spanish actresses
21st-century Spanish actresses
1971 births